Beginning with painter Gilbert Stuart's portrait of George Washington, it has been traditional for the president of the United States to have an official portrait taken during their time in office, most commonly an oil painting. This tradition has continued to modern times, although since the adoption of photography as a widely used and reliable technology, the official portrait may also be a photograph (or at least a photograph may be viable).

Presidents will often display the official portraits of former presidents whom they admire in the Oval Office or elsewhere around the White House, loaned from the National Portrait Gallery. The gallery has collected presidential portraits since its creation in 1962, and began commissioning their portraits in 1994, starting with George H. W. Bush.

In 2018, President Donald Trump signed Public Law 115-158, which prohibits the use of federal funds to pay for an official portrait of any federal official or officer, including the president, the vice president, a member of Congress, the head of an executive agency, or the head of an office of the legislative branch. Since most recent presidential portraits have been privately funded anyway, this law will primarily prevent other governmental officers such as agency heads and Speakers of the House from commissioning official portraits using federal funds.

Presidents

George Washington

The presidential portrait of George Washington was famously rescued by First Lady Dolley Madison when the British burned down the White House in the War of 1812.

Theodore Roosevelt
President Theodore Roosevelt's official portrait was originally commissioned to Théobald Chartran in 1902, but when Roosevelt saw the final product he hated it and hid it in the darkest corner of the White House. When family members called it the "Mewing Cat" for making him look so harmless, he had it destroyed and hired John Singer Sargent to paint a more masculine portrait.

Sargent followed Roosevelt around the rooms of the White House, making sketches looking for the right lighting and pose, but was unhappy with them. When Roosevelt headed toward a staircase to try the rooms on the second level, both of their patience was running thin. Roosevelt suggested that Sargent didn't have a clue what the artist wanted. Sargent responded that Roosevelt didn't know what was needed to pose for a portrait. Roosevelt having reached the landing, planted his hand on the balustrade post, and turned to Sargent angrily demanding "Don't I?!" and the perfect pose had been found.

Roosevelt, always active, only agreed to stay still for half an hour a day, after lunch. But the portrait was eventually finished and was adored by Roosevelt.

Calvin Coolidge
During Ronald Reagan's presidency, he moved Coolidge's portrait from the Grand Hall into the Cabinet Room next to Thomas Jefferson's portrait. Reagan admired and quoted Coolidge, and thought Coolidge's impressive performance in the "roaring twenties" was outstanding. Reagan believed that Coolidge's portrait was much more suitable next to a founding father.

Warren G. Harding
The United States Commission of Fine Arts recommended F. Luis Mora to paint the portrait of Warren G. Harding. The portrait was painted from photographs. Two portraits of Harding painted by 'foreign artists' in the White House were rejected for inferior artistic merit and insufficient likeness. The painting was hung in the White House in June 1930.

Herbert Hoover
President Herbert Hoover's official portrait was completed 23 years after he left office. The first official portrait was painted by John Christen Johansen in 1941. Hoover, however, later commissioned a second portrait that was completed in 1956 by Elmer Wesley Greene. At Hoover's request, this painting replaced the original, and currently stands as the official White House portrait. The Johansen painting now resides at the Herbert Hoover Presidential Library and Museum in West Branch, Iowa.

John F. Kennedy

President John F. Kennedy's official portrait was painted posthumously by Aaron Shikler at the request of Jacqueline Kennedy in 1970. It is generally analyzed as a character study. Unlike most presidential portraits, Kennedy's depicts the president as pensive, with eyes downcast and arms folded. According to Shikler, Jackie's only stipulation was for him to create an image different from "the way everybody else makes him look, with the bags under his eyes and that penetrating gaze. I'm tired of that image." Shikler drew a few sketches based on photographs, one of which was inspired by Ted Kennedy's somber pose at his brother's (John F. Kennedy) grave, his arms crossed and his head bowed. Jackie chose that sketch as the final pose. Shikler also painted the official White House portraits of First Lady Jacqueline Kennedy and the Kennedy children.

Bill Clinton
The presidential portrait of Bill Clinton was the first of such portraits to be painted by an African American, Simmie Knox.

Before that, a portrait was commissioned by the National Portrait Gallery at the Smithsonian Institution. Years following its initial unveiling, the artist of the portrait, Nelson Shanks, revealed he added a subtle shadow on the left-hand side of the painting to reference the Monica Lewinsky scandal and how it was, "a metaphor in that it represents a shadow on the office he held, or on him". According to the Shanks, Clinton "hate[d] the portrait" and wanted it removed from the National Portrait Gallery. As of 2015, it remained in their collection but was not on display.

George W. Bush
The official White House portrait of George W. Bush was revealed on May 31, 2012. It was painted by John Howard Sanden who also painted the official portrait for First Lady Laura Bush that was revealed at the same time as her husband's portrait. In addition, Bush's portrait for the National Portrait Gallery was uncharacteristically released several weeks before his administration had ended. Painted by Robert A. Anderson, it was unveiled at the National Portrait Gallery of the Smithsonian Institution in Washington, D.C., on December 19, 2008. President Bush jokingly opened the unveiling with "Welcome to my hanging", which resulted in laughter from the room.  This was an official portrait commissioned by the White House, but funded by private donorship.

The caption at the National Portrait Gallery beside President Bush's portrait originally read that his administration was "marked by a series of catastrophic events..." [including] "...the attacks on September 11, 2001, that led to wars in Afghanistan and Iraq." Vermont senator Bernie Sanders wrote a letter to the director of the National Portrait Gallery, noting the link between the terrorist attacks and Iraq had been "debunked". Director Martin E. Sullivan assured him the label would be changed to delete "led to".

Barack Obama

Barack Obama was the first president to have his portrait taken with a digital camera in January 2009 by Pete Souza, the then–official White House photographer, using a Canon EOS 5D Mark II. Obama was also the first president to have 3D portraits taken, which were displayed in the Smithsonian Castle in December 2014.

On Monday February 12, 2018, the official presidential likenesses of Barack Obama and Michelle Obama were unveiled at the National Portrait Gallery. Kehinde Wiley painted Mr. Obama, while Amy Sherald painted Mrs. Obama.  Different flowers in the background of Barack Obama's painting are symbolic, with chrysanthemums, for example, representing Chicago, and pikake representing Hawaii. The contemporary style of both paintings attracted note for breaking the trend of past presidential portraits being painted in a traditional style. 

The official White House portrait of Barack Obama was unveiled on September 7, 2022. It was painted by Robert McCurdy, who focused on working off of a photograph of the former President. In the photorealistic portrait, Obama is dressed in a black suit with a gray tie, and painted against a minimal white backdrop, a signature of McCurdy's artworks. At the same time, the official portrait for First Lady Michelle Obama, painted by realism artist Sharon Sprung, was also unveiled. In First Lady Obama's oil painting portrait, she appears in an off-the-shoulder turquoise gown against a warm pink wall, looking "intent but alluring and unmistakably herself."

Donald Trump
The first official presidential portrait of Donald Trump was released the day before his inauguration and was used for the official @POTUS Twitter account until May 5, 2017. His portrait painting has been commissioned by the National Portrait Gallery using donations from Trump's Save America PAC.

Galleries

White House Historical Association presidential portraits

 Note: The official portraits for Gerald Ford, Jimmy Carter, Ronald Reagan, George H. W. Bush, Bill Clinton, George W. Bush, and Barack Obama were painted by artists who were not employed by the federal government at the time. These images are not in the public domain, and as such, are not included in this gallery. The full list can be seen here: The White House Historical Association Presidential Portraits. The White House Historical Association portrait of Donald Trump is yet to be unveiled.

National Portrait Gallery presidential portraits

 Note: Theodore Roosevelt and the presidents following Coolidge are excluded due to their being out of the public domain. The full list may be seen at this link: National Portrait Gallery's "America's Presidents" collection. For the article about the portrait of Barack Obama from the National Portrait Gallery, President Barack Obama (painting).

See also
List of presidents of the United States
National Portrait Gallery

References

External links

 The White House Official Portraits of the US Presidents (archive)
 White House Historical Association

White House
United States
American paintings
Cultural depictions of presidents of the United States
18th-century portraits
19th-century portraits
20th-century portraits
21st-century portraits
Articles containing video clips